La Madre María is a 1974 Argentine drama film directed by Lucas Demare.

Plot
La Madre María is based on the life of María Salomé Loredo, a renowned Argentina faith healer (1854-1928). The film begins with an old Madre Maria on trial for quackery and deceit. On a series of flashbacks, her life is told, starting with a visit María paid to another famous Argentina faith healer, Pancho Sierra.

Pancho Sierra instructs Madre María to continue his work by helping the poor and praying with the sick. After her husband's death, Madre María establishes a mission or co-op in La Rioja Street in Buenos Aires. She teaches women how to sew, delivers food to the hungry, pays the debts of the poor. She prays with the sick and teaches a simple gospel of faith in God.

After the medical establishment begins to use the police and the judicial system to stop her work, María is exiled in Turdera, near Buenos Aires, where she starts her work among the poor and the sick one more time. She starts an orphanage and defends the workers from police brutality.

Maria's defense prevails in the trial, and a cheering crowd receives her in her home, but she faints and shortly after dies. The final scene shows a solemn funeral procession taking María's casket to the cemetery.

Cast

 Tita Merello as Madre María
 José Slavin
 Hugo Arana
 Patricia Castell
 María José Demare
 Alejandra Da Passano
 Adrian Ghio
 Tina Serrano
 Fernando Labat
 Bernardo Perrone
 Adriana Parets
 Cristina Murta
 Carlos Muñoz
 Marta Gam
 Diana Ingro
 Horacio Nicolai
 Héctor Gance
 Rey Charol
 Sara Bonet
 Marcelo José
 Inés Murray
 Rogelio Romano

See also
 Faith healing

External links

 

1974 films
Argentine drama films
1970s Spanish-language films
Films directed by Lucas Demare
1970s Argentine films
Films about faith healing